Sumalia daraxa, the green commodore, is a species of nymphalid butterfly found in tropical and subtropical Asia.

References

Cited reference

Limenitidinae
Butterflies of Asia
Butterflies described in 1848
Taxa named by Henry Doubleday